Marrar is a town in the central east part of the Riverina region of New South Wales. Australia. At the 2016 census, Marrar had a population of 368.

Marrar Post Office opened on 1 April 1902.

Sport
The most popular sport in Marrar is Australian rules football, as it lies in the narrow 'canola belt', a geographical triangle stretching from the town to Grong Grong at either end of the Canola Way, to Lake Cargelligo, in which Australian football retains a strong following, despite New South Wales being a largely rugby league supporting state.

The Marrar Football Club won the 1918 Coolamon District Football Association premiership.

The Marrar FC won three premierships in the South West Football League (New South Wales) in 1918, 1919 and 1923.

The Marrar FC played in the South West Football League (New South Wales) from 1919 - 26, 1932, 1949–51, then played the Albury & District Football League's Reserve competition from 1952 to 1956.

Marr FC then played in the Central Riverina Football League from 1957 to 1981 and were premiers in 1965, 1966 and 1979 and were runners up in 1958, 1959, 1960, 1971, 1977, 1980 and 1981.

Marra FC have played in the Farrer Football League since 1982 and have won senior football premierships in 1995 and 1996, 2017 and 2018.

Notes and references

Links
Marrar FNC: Bonmbers Cententary Book
South West Football League (New South Wales)
Central Riverina Football League

Towns in the Riverina
Towns in New South Wales
Coolamon Shire